The Nissan Lucino is a small automobile nameplate used by the Japanese manufacturer Nissan between 1994 and 2000. The Lucino name applied simultaneously to a pair of entirely different vehicles—a two-door coupé version of the Sunny/Sentra (B14)—and badge engineered versions of the Nissan Pulsar (N15) three- and five-door hatchbacks. For Japan, coupés arrived first in 1994, followed by hatchbacks in 1995. Production in Japan ended in 1999, except for the five-door that lingered on until 2000.

Outside Japan, the coupé retailed in Mexico under its original name. North American customers were offered the coupé as the Nissan 200SX between 1995 and 1998, for model years of the same.

Coupé (B14; 1994–1999) 

Based on the Nissan Sunny (B14) four-door sedan, the B14 series Lucino two-door coupé launched in 1994 to Japan, replacing the Sunny (B13) two-door sedan. The Lucino shared its basic styling, including front-end appearance, front-wheel-drive chassis, interior dashboard, and many dimensions with the Sunny. With the B14, Nissan decided to differentiate the two-door model from the four-door in Japan through means of a different name. This was to appeal to a new market of buyers who were very familiar with the Sunny, and augment the two-door coupé with badge engineered Nissan Pulsar (N15) hatchbacks, while still offering the Sunny as a four-door sedan. The affordable and traditionally practical two-door model was renamed Lucino, which was derived from the word "lucina", a character in Greek and Roman mythology for the goddess of birth.

All versions of the Lucino were exclusive to Nissan dealerships in Japan called Nissan Satio Store, just as the previous Sunny two-door had been. In 1999, when Nissan consolidated Nissan Satio Store locations into Nissan Red Stage, the Lucino coupé was cancelled.

In Mexico, the Lucino sold between 1996 and 2000 under its original name. In Mexico, two versions were available: GSE with the 1.6-liter engine, and GSR with the 2.0-liter unit.

Nissan 200SX 

For the United States and Canada, Nissan renamed the Lucino, recycling the 200SX nameplate to designate the two-door coupé version of the Nissan Sunny/Sentra (B14). The 200SX, introduced in 1995 for the 1995 model year, replaced Nissan's previous compact two-door models, the Sentra (B13) and NX. With exception to this Lucino-derived model, every other Nissan with a name ending in "SX" refers to a car based on the Nissan S platform.

The North American 200SX came in base, SE, and sportier SE-R models. Base and SE editions shared the Sentra's twin-cam, 1.6-liter GA16DE inline-four engine. The SE-R inherited the  2.0-liter SR20DE engine used in the previous two-door Sentra SE-R. All three came with a five-speed manual transmission or four-speed automatic, and were equipped with dual airbags. Anti-lock brakes were optional in the SE and SE-R. The 200SX was never supplied with the SR16VE engine used by the Lucino in Japan.

North American cars received model year updates for 1996, 1997 and 1998:

1996
The SE and SE-R gained new body-colored mirrors and door handles.

1997
The base model adopted the same interior trim as its SE and SE-R companions, the round exhaust finisher was changed to an oval unit for this year's SE-R model, and the rear spoiler was made standard on all trim levels. For California, the SE-R was no longer available due to tightening emissions requirements.

1998
The SE-R returned to California this year, with additional emissions equipment on the SR20DE engine. The viscous limited-slip differential (VLSD) that came with the 1995 to 1997 model year SE-R trim levels was eliminated. All models received new head- and tail-lamps, revised bumpers. an altered grille, and white-face gauges. Base models replaced the 13-inch wheels with 14-inch versions. For the SE, an oval exhaust finisher replaced previous year's round exhaust finisher.

Hatchback (N15; 1995–2000) 

Designated N15, the Lucino three- and five-door hatchbacks sold only in Japan, exclusive to the Nissan Satio Store from 1995. These were badge engineered versions of the Nissan Pulsar Series (N15) sold at Nissan Cherry Store locations. Three-door models lasted until 1999, with the five-door model seeing its demise in 2000, fully retiring the Lucino name and product line in Japan. This discontinuation occurred without a direct successor.

Production 

Lucino
Coupés
Front-wheel-drive sports cars
Rear-wheel-drive vehicles
Sport compact cars
Cars introduced in 1994